The River at Green Knowe is a children's novel written by Lucy M. Boston, first published in 1959. It is part of the Green Knowe series, and is the third published in the sequence.

Characters
Ping - The quietest of the children.
Ida -  the leader of the children
Oskar -  oldest of the children
Terak - the friendly giant

Plot

Mrs. Oldknow and Tolly do not appear in The River at Green Knowe.  It is summertime and Green Knowe has been let to two women, the archaeologist Doctor Maud Biggin and her friend, Miss Sybilla Bun. Doctor Biggin has invited her great-niece Ida and two "displaced" refugee children, Oskar and Ping, to stay with them at Green Knowe.

The children arrive and begin to explore the river and canals round Green Knowe by canoe. Unlike the previous two books, this book centres on the river which flows past the manor, and adjacent islands.  The children's adventures here are based in their current time, though strongly fantasy-based; they meet a bus driver who's retreated from modern money-based society, see flying horses, meet a giant, and witness a Bronze Age moon ceremony. The subtext, of homeless children being protected and healed by the house and its enchantments, is particularly strong.

External links
"Crosscurrents in The River at Green Knowe by Lucy M. Boston" by David Lenander from Children's Literature Association Quarterly, January 1989 doi:10.1353/chq.1989.0000
The River at Green Knowe at Fantastic Fiction
 

1959 British novels
Children's fantasy novels
Faber and Faber books
1959 children's books
British children's novels